This is a list of former and current non-federal courthouses in the Commonwealth of Pennsylvania.  Each of the 67 counties in the Commonwealth has a city or borough designated as the county seat where the county government resides, including a county courthouse for the court of general jurisdiction, the Court of Common Pleas. Other courthouses are used by the three state-wide appellate courts (the Supreme Court, the Superior Court, and the Commonwealth Court), or minor courts such as the municipal courts of Philadelphia and Pittsburgh, or magisterial district courts. As noted below, some courthouses are listed on the National Register of Historic Places.

17th-19th centuries

After William Penn landed in the new Province of Pennsylvania in 1682, he set up a general-purpose Provincial Court. The state supreme court traces its origin to that institution. The oldest existing building in the Commonwealth that was used for the judiciary is the Chester County Courthouse of 1724, used for trials until 1967. The Franklin County courthouse was destroyed by Confederate troops in 1864 during the American Civil War.

State and county courthouses

See also
 List of United States federal courthouses in Pennsylvania
 Pennsylvania Constitution
 List of courthouses in the United States

References

Sources

External links

Pennsylvania geography-related lists

Pennsylvania law
Courthouses in Pennsylvania
County courthouses in Pennsylvania
Government buildings in Pennsylvania
Buildings and structures in Pennsylvania by type
County government buildings in Pennsylvania
Buildings and structures in Pennsylvania
Buildings and structures in Pennsylvania by county
Courthouses, state
Legal history of Pennsylvania